Miloslav Sochor (born 8 January 1952) is a Czech alpine skier. He competed in three events at the 1976 Winter Olympics.

References

External links
 

1952 births
Living people
People from Pec pod Sněžkou
Czech male alpine skiers
Olympic alpine skiers of Czechoslovakia
Alpine skiers at the 1976 Winter Olympics
Sportspeople from the Hradec Králové Region